V471 Tauri (short V471 Tau) is a eclipsing variable star in the constellation of Taurus. The star has a visual magnitude of 9 which makes it impossible to see with the naked eye. It is around 155 light-years away from the Solar System.

Physical properties 
The V471 Tauri system has at least two members: a white dwarf star of spectral type D2; and a K-type main sequence star (K2 V). There are variations in the timing of the eclipses that were once thought to be due to a third member of the system, proposed to be a brown dwarf, but this has been ruled out and the eclipse variations may be caused by the Applegate mechanism.  The system is located in the Hyades star cluster.

References 

K-type main-sequence stars
White dwarfs
Multiple stars
Taurus (constellation)
Tauri, V471
017962